Gebrüder Weiss is an international transport and logistics company with its head office in Lauterach, Austria. The company has around 8,000 employees working at 180 company-owned locations in 35 countries. In the last fiscal year (2021), it posted annual sales of 2.5 billion euros.

The company's umbrella organization, Gebrüder Weiss Holding AG, not only encompasses its primary business of land transport, air and sea freight, but also a whole host of subsidiary companies – including the logistics consultancy Xvise, tectraxx (industry specialist for high-tech companies), dicall (communication solutions, market research, training), rail cargo (rail transports) and Gebrüder Weiss Paketdienst, which is a co-shareholder of the Austrian company DPD.

History of Gebrüder Weiss 

The Gebrüder Weiss roots can be traced back more than 500 years. Ancestors of the Senger-Weiss family, who owns the company, connected the trading centers of Milan and Lindau as the Lindau Messenger. When the old route through the Via Mala gorge was expanded in 1474, the Lindau, also known as Milan, Messenger became a regular service. The route went from Lindau via Fussach and Chur and the 2100-meter-high Splügen Pass to Lake Como and on to Milan.

For centuries, the Lindau Messenger was one of the most important services on the transalpine north-south axis. The Messenger used various methods to transport technical goods, money, silk or food: boats for Lake Constance and Lake Como, horses for the flatter sections and mules for the mountainous ones along the Via Mala. The Lindau Messenger also carried or escorted people across the Alps, one of the most famous passengers being Johann Wolfgang von Goethe. The poet took advantage of the Messenger service on his way back from Italy in 1788.

Seven years earlier, in 1781, the Lindau Messenger Johann Kasimir Weiss set another milestone on the journey to creating the logistics company we know today. He became a partner of his father-in-law Johann Schneider, who ran a factory (otherwise known as a trading post) in Fussach on the shores of Lake Constance. The trading post was the central point for temporary storage and managing messaging services, but also increasingly for the transport needs of the then-emerging Vorarlberg textile industry; it was a precursor to a modern logistics terminal, where flows of goods are consolidated as required.

Formation of the GmbH 

When in 1822, the last manager of the trading post from the Schneider family died without any immediate heirs, it became the sole property of Josef Weiss in 1823. Together with his half-brothers Leonhard and Johann Alois Karl Weiss, he continued the company under the name Gebrüder Weiss, which translates to Weiss Brothers in English. On July 1, 1872, the company's head office was moved from Fussach to Bregenz.

Until 1914, Gebrüder Weiss set up branches throughout the Danube Monarchy in Vienna, Trieste and Gorizia, Venice and Genoa, Lindau, Germany and Buchs, and St. Margrethen and Romanshorn in Switzerland.

At 23, Ferdinand Weiss took over the management of the family business in 1921. The company underwent steady expansion despite the global economic crisis, including establishing branches in Hamburg and Wels.

Expansion in Austria 

The company started expanding in Austria in 1950, opening new branches in Innsbruck, Graz, and Linz. When Ferdinand Weiss died suddenly after 43 years of sole responsibility, his daughter Heidegunde (Heidi) and her husband Paul Senger took over the company's management in 1968.

In addition to continuing to expand with new branches, in 1988 Gebrüder Weiss collaborated with two Austrian partners, Lagermax and Schachinger and founded the parcel service, APS Austria Paket System (known today as DPD Austria). Within a short time, it became the market leader in the B2B sector in Austria.

Global expansion 

After the fall of the Iron Curtain in 1989, Gebrüder Weiss started expanding into the neighboring Central and Eastern countries, starting with the countries directly adjacent. Branches were established in Hungary, Czechia, Slovakia, Croatia, and Serbia, followed by every other country up to the Black Sea coast. Bosnia and North Macedonia also became part of the network.

Gebrüder Weiss took over all land and logistics operations of Hellmann Worldwide in Czechia at the beginning of 2009.

The company posted an annual sale of over one billion euros in the 2011 fiscal year for the first time in its history.

In 2012, Gebrüder Weiss established a logistics terminal in Tbilisi, Georgia, followed by more locations in Kazakhstan, Armenia, Uzbekistan, Russia, and Turkey. In Germany, Gebrüder Weiss took full control of the freight forwarder Diehl in Baden-Württemberg.

In 2014, Gebrüder Weiss moved into its new head office in Lauterach, Vorarlberg. The company established a joint venture in China with the Jilin International Transport Corporation (JIT), focusing on automotive logistics.

In the Home Delivery segment, Gebrüder Weiss consolidated its position as the market leader for B2C deliveries in Austria and expanded its services in numerous Eastern European countries.

In 2017, Gebrüder Weiss set up an own country organization in the USA and Canada with initial locations in Chicago, New York, Atlanta, Boston, Dallas, Los Angeles, Vancouver, Montreal, and Toronto. In the same year, also new branches in China gave a further boost to the East Asian network.

Further growth 

Gebrüder Weiss kept its services up and running during the coronavirus pandemic in 2020. The digital customer portal myGW was launched in Austria, Germany, Switzerland, Czechia, Slovakia, and Hungary. Gebrüder Weiss continued to expand and entered the markets of South Korea, Australia, and New Zealand. The acquisition of Ipsen Logistics  enabled Gebrüder Weiss to enlarge its network of Air & Sea locations in Germany and take over locations in Poland and Malaysia.

In the United States, Gebrüder Weiss maintained its growth and added a cross-border location in El Paso, Texas in 2022.

References 

Article contains translated text from Gebrüder Weiss on German Wikipedia from 25 February 2017.

Transport companies of Austria
Logistics companies of Austria
Companies established in the 15th century
15th-century establishments in Austria